The discography of the Vengaboys, a Dutch Eurodance pop group, consists of two studio albums, twenty singles and fifteen music videos. The first release was the group's debut album Up & Down – The Party Album in 1998 for the Dutch market. This was released internationally as The Party Album in 1999. 

The group's second album,The Platinum Album, was released in 2000. After that release, the band went on a hiatus before returning in 2011 with new material and their second compilation album The Best of Vengaboys.

Albums

Studio albums

Compilation albums

Remix albums

Extended plays

Singles

Promotional singles

Music videos

Notes

References

Discographies of Dutch artists